Mangelia pomara is a species of sea snail, a marine gastropod mollusk in the family Mangeliidae.

Description
The length of the shell attains 7 mm, its diameter 3 mm.

(Original description) The small, solid and discolored shell has a fusiform shape. It contains six moderately convex whorls. The protoconch is small, subglobular and smooth (slightly decorticated). The axial
sculpture consists of (on the penultimate whorl 11, on the body whorl 9) promment, slightly shouldered ribs with wider interspaces. The ribs undulate the appressed suture. The spiral sculpture consists of close-set alternated threads over the whole surface except between the shoulder and the suture, which is arcuately striated by the incremental lines. The aperture is narrow and straight. The anal sulcus is moderate. The outer lip is thickened and simple.  The inner lip shows a wash of enamel. The siphonal canal is hardly differentiated.

Distribution
This marine species occurs off San Pedro, California, USA.

References

External links
  Tucker, J.K. 2004 Catalog of recent and fossil turrids (Mollusca: Gastropoda). Zootaxa 682:1–1295.
 

pomara
Gastropods described in 1919